The 1990 Australia rugby union tour of New Zealand was a series of matches played by Australia national rugby union team in New Zealand between July and August 1990. Australia lost the series against new Zealand with one victory on three matches. "All Blacks" hold the Bledisloe Cup, conquested in 1987.

Results 
Scores and results list Australia's points tally first.

Sources

Australia national rugby union team tours of New Zealand
tour
tour